Brian Manion Dennehy (July 9, 1938 – April 15, 2020) was an American actor of stage, television, and film. He won two Tony Awards, an Olivier Award, and a Golden Globe, and received six Primetime Emmy Award nominations. Dennehy had roles in over 180 films and in many television and stage productions. His film roles included First Blood (1982), Gorky Park (1983), Silverado (1985), Cocoon (1985), F/X (1986), Presumed Innocent (1990), Romeo + Juliet (1996), Ratatouille (2007), and Knight of Cups (2015). Dennehy won the Golden Globe Award for Best Actor in a Miniseries or Television Film for his role as Willy Loman in the television film Death of a Salesman (2000).

According to Variety, Dennehy was "perhaps the foremost living interpreter" of playwright Eugene O'Neill's works on stage and screen. He had a decades long relationship with Chicago's Goodman Theatre where much of his O'Neill work originated. He also regularly played Canada's Stratford Festival, especially in works by William Shakespeare and Samuel Beckett. He once gave credit for his award-winning performances to the play's authors: "When you walk with giants, you learn how to take bigger steps." Dennehy was inducted into the American Theater Hall of Fame in 2010.

Early life
Brian Manion Dennehy was born on July 9, 1938, in Bridgeport, Connecticut, to Hannah (Manion), a nurse, and Edward Dennehy, a wire service editor for the Associated Press. He had two brothers, Michael and Edward. He was of Irish ancestry and was raised Catholic. The family relocated to Long Island, New York, where Dennehy attended Chaminade High School in the village of Mineola.

He entered Columbia University in New York City on a football scholarship in the fall of 1956. He interrupted his college education to spend five years in the U.S. Marines. He was stationed in the U.S., Japan, and Korea. He returned to Columbia in 1960 and graduated in 1965 with a B.A. in history. While acting in regional theater he supported his family by working blue-collar jobs including driving a taxi and bartending. He hated his brief stint as a stockbroker for Merrill Lynch in their Manhattan office in the mid-1970s. He later described how working odd hours allowed him to attend matinee theater performances that provided his acting education: "I never went to acting school—I was a truck driver and I used to go see everything I could see—Wednesday afternoons".  In the 1970s, stage performances in New York led to television and film work.

Career

Film
Dennehy was primarily known as a dramatic actor. His breakthrough role was as the overzealous sheriff Will Teasle in First Blood (1982) opposite Sylvester Stallone as John Rambo.

His earlier films included several comedies, like Semi-Tough with Burt Reynolds (in which he portrayed a pro football player), Foul Play with Chevy Chase, and 10 with Dudley Moore (as a Manzanillo bartender). He later portrayed a corrupt sheriff in the western Silverado and an alien in Cocoon, both released in 1985.

Dennehy had memorable supporting parts in such films as Split Image (1982), Legal Eagles (1986), Cocoon: The Return (1988), F/X: Murder By Illusion (1986), Presumed Innocent (1990), F/X2: The Deadly Art of Illusion (1991) and Prophet of Evil (1993).

Dennehy gradually became a valuable character actor but also achieved leading-man status in the thriller Best Seller (1987) co-starring James Woods. He also starred in the Peter Greenaway film The Belly of an Architect, for which he won the Best Actor Award at the 1987 Chicago International Film Festival. Commenting upon this unusual venture, Dennehy said, "I've been in a lot of movies but this is the first film I've made."

He went on to star as Harrison in the Australian film The Man from Snowy River II in 1988.

One of his most well-known roles came in the 1995 Chris Farley-David Spade comedy Tommy Boy as Big Tom Callahan. He also was reunited with his 10 co-star Bo Derek in Tommy Boy, in which she played his wife.

Dennehy had a voice role in the animated movie Ratatouille as Django, father of the rat chef Remy. He appeared as the superior officer of Robert De Niro and Al Pacino in the 2008 cop drama Righteous Kill and as the father of Russell Crowe in the 2010 suspense film The Next Three Days.

Dennehy starred as Clarence Darrow in Alleged, a film based on the Scopes Monkey Trial, the famous court battle over the teaching of evolution in American public schools.

Television 
Dennehy's early professional acting career included small guest roles in such 1970s and 1980s series as Kojak, Lou Grant, Dallas, Dynasty, and Hunter. He also appeared in an episode of Miami Vice during the 1987–88 season.

Dennehy portrayed Sergeant Ned T. "Frozen Chosen" Coleman in the television movie A Rumor of War (1980) opposite Brad Davis. He continued to appear in such high-profile television films as Skokie (1981), Split Image (1982), Day One (1989), and A Killing in a Small Town (1990) opposite Barbara Hershey. He also played the title role in HBO's Teamster Boss: The Jackie Presser Story.

Dennehy had a lead role as fire chief/celebrity dad Leslie "Buddy" Krebs in the short-lived 1982 series Star of the Family. Despite his star power, that show was cancelled after a half-season. He starred in the crime drama Jack Reed TV movies.

Dennehy was nominated for Emmy Awards six times for his television movies. In 1992, he was nominated for Outstanding Lead Actor in a Miniseries or TV Movie for his performance as John Wayne Gacy in To Catch a Killer, and he was nominated that same year in a different category, Outstanding Supporting Actor in a Miniseries or TV Movie, for The Burden of Proof. Dennehy's other Emmy nominations were for his work in A Killing in a Small Town, Murder in the Heartland (1993) and his work in the Showtime cable TV movie Our Fathers (2005), which was about the Roman Catholic Church sex abuse scandal. In 2000, Dennehy was nominated for an Emmy for Outstanding Lead Actor in a Miniseries or TV Movie for a television presentation for his performance as Willy Loman in Arthur Miller's Death of a Salesman which he had performed on Broadway. While not gaining the actor an Emmy win, the performance did, however, win him a Golden Globe Award. He also appeared as a recurring character in the NBC sitcom Just Shoot Me!.

A cartoon version of Dennehy appeared in the 1999 film South Park: Bigger, Longer & Uncut as well as in an episode of The Simpsons.

In January 2007, he starred in the episode "Scheherazade" of Law & Order: Special Victims Unit as a retired criminal who wants to reconnect with his daughter and admit his crimes before dying of a terminal disease thus eventually clearing a wrongfully imprisoned inmate. In April 2008, Dennehy guest-starred as a Teamster boss in "Sandwich Day", an episode of the TV series 30 Rock. He guest-starred in a 2009 episode of Rules of Engagement as the father of the main character, Jeff.

Dennehy starred as Elizabeth Keen's grandfather on the NBC series The Blacklist since the third season until his death from sepsis. He is replaced by actor Ron Raines during the show's eighth season.

In 2015 Dennehy co-starred in the Amazon Studios pilot Cocked with Jason Lee, Dreama Walker, Diora Baird, and Sam Trammell.

Dennehy also narrated many television programs  including the Canadian-Irish docudrama Death or Canada.

Theater
Dennehy won two Tony Awards, both times for Best Lead Actor in a Play. His first win was for Death of a Salesman (for which he also won a Laurence Olivier Award for the production's London run), in 1999, and the second was for Eugene O'Neill's Long Day's Journey into Night in 2003. Both productions were directed by Robert Falls and were originally produced at the Goodman Theatre company in Chicago, Illinois.  His acting in the "Salesman" was called "the performance of Dennehy's career".

On stage, Dennehy frequently performed in the Chicago theater world, and made his Broadway debut in 1995 in Brian Friel's Translations. In 1999, he was the first male performer to be voted the Sarah Siddons Award for his work in Chicago theater. He made a return to Broadway in 2007 as Matthew Harrison Brady in Inherit the Wind opposite Christopher Plummer, then returned again opposite Carla Gugino in a 2009 revival of Eugene O'Neill's Desire Under the Elms.

In fall 1992, he played the lead role of Hickey in Robert Falls's production of Eugene O'Neill's The Iceman Cometh at the Abbey Theatre in Dublin.

In 2008, Dennehy appeared at the Stratford Shakespeare Festival, in Stratford, Ontario, Canada, appearing in All's Well That Ends Well as the King of France, and a double bill of plays, Samuel Beckett's Krapp's Last Tape and Eugene O'Neill's Hughie, where Dennehy reprised the role of Erie Smith. In 2010, he was inducted into the American Theatre Hall of Fame. In December 2010, he returned to Ireland to play Bull McCabe in the Olympia Theatre of Dublin's stage version of John B. Keane's The Field.

In 2011, Dennehy returned to the Stratford Shakespeare Festival in the role of Sir Toby Belch in Shakespeare's Twelfth Night. He also played Max in Harold Pinter's The Homecoming, the first Pinter work to be produced there.

In April through June 2012, he played the role of Larry Slade in the Eugene O'Neill play The Iceman Cometh'' at the Goodman Theatre in Chicago, which he reprised in 2015 when the production, with most of the Goodman Theater production cast, was revived at the BAM Harvey Theater in Brooklyn, New York, New York.

Stolen valor
Dennehy enlisted in the United States Marine Corps serving from 1958 to 1963, including playing football on Okinawa. In several interviews, he described being wounded in combat and repeatedly claimed to have served in Vietnam.

In 1999, he apologized for misrepresenting his military record, stating: "I lied about serving in Vietnam, and I'm sorry. I did not mean to take away from the actions and the sacrifices of the ones who did really serve there ... I did steal valor. That was very wrong of me. There is no real excuse for that."

Personal life
Dennehy married for the first time while in the Marines in the early 1960s. Before he finished college he and his first wife had three daughters. Two of them became actresses, including Elizabeth Dennehy. After his first marriage ended in divorce in 1987, he married Jennifer Arnott, an Australian, in 1988, they had two children, a son and a daughter.

Death
Dennehy died on April 15, 2020, of cardiac arrest due to sepsis. in New Haven, Connecticut. He was survived by his wife and his five children.

Filmography

Film

Television films

Television series

Video games

Awards and nominations

Notes

References

External links

 
 
 
 Photograph of Dennehy as "Doctor D." in Michael Mann's The Jericho Mile (1979)
 Star File: Brian Dennehy
 

1938 births
2020 deaths
20th-century American male actors
21st-century American male actors
American male film actors
American male stage actors
American male television actors
American people of Irish descent
Best Miniseries or Television Movie Actor Golden Globe winners
Chaminade High School alumni
Columbia Lions football players
Columbia College (New York) alumni
Deaths from sepsis
Drama Desk Award winners
Laurence Olivier Award winners
Male actors from Bridgeport, Connecticut
Military personnel from Bridgeport, Connecticut
Outstanding Performance by a Male Actor in a Miniseries or Television Movie Screen Actors Guild Award winners
People from Mineola, New York
Tony Award winners
United States Marines